Diaphoreolis viridis is a species of sea slug, an aeolid nudibranch, a marine gastropod mollusk in the family Trinchesiidae.

Distribution
This species was described from Ballaugh, Isle of Man in the Irish Sea. It has been reported from the NE Atlantic, from Greenland and Iceland south to Roscoff, France.

Description 
The maximum recorded length is 19 mm.

Ecology
Feeds on the hydroids Sertularella spp. especially Sertularella rugosa. Found in shallow exposed and semi-sheltered rocky areas to 100 m depth. Minimum recorded depth is 4 m. Maximum recorded depth is 10 m.

References 

Trinchesiidae
Gastropods described in 1840
Taxa named by Edward Forbes